The Bruckner Gesamtausgabe (Brucker's Complete Edition) is a critical edition of the works of Anton Bruckner.
Alte Gesamtausgabe (1930–1944, Editorial Head: Robert Haas)This first edition (12 volumes issued) included 'hybrid' scores for Symphonies Nos. 2 and 8 and other similar conflations for some other revised works (Mass No. 3).
Neue Gesamtausgabe (1951–1989, Editorial Head: Leopold Nowak)In this new edition Nowak et al. went about publishing several versions of some works, in the process correcting some mistakes of Haas. From 1990 onwards (Editorial Head: Herbert Vogg), William Carragan, Paul Hawkshaw, Benjamin-Gunnar Cohrs et al. were in the process of reviewing and further correcting the work of Haas and Nowak.
Anton Bruckner Gesamtausgabe (Editorial board: Paul Hawkshaw, Thomas Leibnitz, Andreas Lindner, Angela Pachovsky, Thomas Röder)In 2011 it has been decided to issue a new edition, which will include the content of the current edition and integrate the in the meantime retrieved sources.

Content of the first edition 

Twenty-two volumes were foreseen, of which twelve were (partially) issued: 
Volume 1: Symphony No. 1, (revised) "Linz version" and "Vienna version", edited by Robert Haas, 1935
Volume 2: Symphony No. 2 ("mixed" version), edited by Robert Haas, 1938
Volume 3: [Symphony No. 3, 1873 version, Robert Haas, 1944; editorial material lost in Leipzig's bombing]
Volume 4: Symphony No. 4, second version (1878) with 1880 Finale (a.k.a. 1881 version) – 1878 Volksfest Finale, edited by Robert Haas, 1936
Volume 5: Symphony No. 5, edited by Robert Haas, 1935
Volume 6: Symphony No. 6, edited by Robert Haas, 1935
Volume 7: Symphony No. 7, edited by Robert Haas, 1944
Volume 8: Symphony No. 8 ("mixed" version), edited by Robert Haas, 1939
Volume 9: Symphony No. 9, edited by Alfred Orel, 1934
Volume 10: –
Volume 11: Four Orchestral Pieces, edited by Alfred Orel, 1934
Volume 12: –
Volume 13: Mass No. 2, second version, edited by Robert Haas and Leopold Nowak 1940
Volume 14: Mass No. 3, edited by Robert Haas, 1944
Volume 15: Requiem and Missa solemnis, edited by Robert Haas, 1930

Content of the second edition 
 Volume I: Symphony No. 1 in C minor
 I/1: "(revised) Linz version" (1877), re-edition by Leopold Nowak, 1953
 I/1A: Adagio (original version 1865-1866, fragment), Scherzo (earlier composition 1865), edited by Wolfgang Grandjean, 1995  
 I/2: "Vienna version" (1890–1891), re-edition by Günter Brosche, 1980
 Volume II: Symphony No. 2 in C minor
 II/1: First version (1872), edited by William Carragan, 2005
 II/2: Second version (1877), re-edition by Leopold Nowak, 1965 / new edition by William Carragan, 2007
 Volume III: Symphony No. 3 in D minor
 III/1: First version (1873), edited by Leopold Nowak, 1977 
 /1A: Adagio No. 2 (1876), edited by Leopold Nowak, 1980
 III/2: Second version (1877), edited by Leopold Nowak, 1981
 III/3: Third version (1889), edited by Leopold Nowak, 1959
 Volume IV: Symphony No. 4 in E-flat major
 IV/1: First version (1874), edited by Leopold Nowak, 1975
 IV/2: Second version (1878) with 1880 Finale (a.k.a. 1886 version), re-edition by Leopold Nowak, 1953
 IV/2F: 1878 Finale, re-edition by Leopold Nowak, 1981
 IV/3: Third version (1888), edited by Benjamin M. Korstvedt, 2004
 Volume V: Symphony No. 5 in B-flat major (1878), re-edition by Leopold Nowak, 1951
 Volume VI: Symphony No. 6 in A major (1881), re-edition by Leopold Nowak, 1952
 Volume VII: Symphony No. 7 in E major (1883), re-edition by Leopold Nowak, 1954
 Volume VIII: Symphony No. 8 in C minor
 VIII/1: First version (1887), edited by Leopold Nowak, 1972 - new edition by Paul Hawkshaw, 2017
 VIII/2: Second version (1890), re-edition by Leopold Nowak, 1955
 Volume IX: Symphony No. 9 in D minor (1894), re-edition by Leopold Nowak, 1951 / new edition by Benjamin Gunnar Cohrs, 2000
 IX/1: First movement
 IX/2: Scherzo
 IX/2-Q: Two posthumous trios for the Scherzo, with viola solo (1889/1893), edited by Benjamin Gunnar Cohrs, 1998 
 IX/3: Adagio
 IX/4: Finale Fragment (1895-1896), edited by John A. Phillips, 1994/1999
 Volume X: Symphony in F minor ("Studiensymphonie", 1863), edited by Leopold Nowak, 1973
 Volume XI: Symphony in D minor ("No. 0", 1869), edited by Leopold Nowak, 1968
 Volume XII: Early Orchestral and Instrumental Works
 XII/1: Rondo in C minor for string quartet (1862), edited by Leopold Nowak, 1985 
 XII/2: Works for solo piano (1850–1869), edited by Walburga Litschauer, 1988/2000
 XII/3: Piano works for four hands (1853–1855), edited by Walburga Litschauer, 1994
 XII/4: Four orchestral pieces (1862), re-edition by Hans Jancik und Rüdiger Bornhöft, 1996
 XII/5: Overture in G minor (1863), edited by Hans Jancik und Rüdiger Bornhöft, 1996
 XII/6: Organ works (1846–1890), edited by Erwin Horn, 2001
 XII/6A: Five pieces in E-flat major (1836–1837), probably not by Bruckner
 XII/7: Abendklänge for violin and piano (1866), edited by Walburga Litschauer, 1995
 XII/8: March in E-flat minor for military band (1865), edited by Rüdiger Bornhöft, 1996
 Volume XIII: Chamber Music
 XIII/1: String quartet in C minor (1861–1862), edited by Leopold Nowak, 1955
 XIII/2: String quintet in F major - Intermezzo in D minor (1878–1879), edited by Leopold Nowak, 1963 / revised edition by Gerold G. Gruber, 2007
 Volume XIV: Requiem in D minor (1849), re-edition by Leopold Nowak, 1966 / revised edition by Rüdiger Bornhöft, 1998
 Volume XV: Missa solemnis in B-flat (1854), re-edition by Leopold Nowak, 1957
 Volume XVI: Mass No. 1 in D minor (1864),  edited by Leopold Nowak, 1975
 Volume XVII: Mass No. 2 in E minor
 XVII/1: First version (1866), edited by Leopold Nowak, 1977
 XVII/2: Second version (1882), re-edition by Leopold Nowak, 1959
 Volume XVIII: Mass No. 3 in F minor (1867/1868), re-edition by Leopold Nowak, 1960 / new edition by Paul Hawkshaw, 2005
 Volume XIX: Te Deum (1884), edited by Leopold Nowak, 1962
 Volume XX: Psalms and Magnificat
 XX/1: Psalm 114 (1852), edited by Paul Hawkshaw, 1997
 XX/2: Psalm 22 (1852), edited by Paul Hawkshaw, 1997
 XX/3: Magnificat (1852), edited by Paul Hawkshaw, 1997
 XX/4: Psalm 146 (1856–1858), edited by Paul Hawkshaw, 1996
 XX/5: Psalm 112 (1863), edited by Paul Hawkshaw, 1996
 XX/6: Psalm 150 (1892), edited by Franz Grasberger, 1964
 Volume XXI: Smaller sacred Works (1835–1892), edited by Hans Bauernfeind and Leopold Nowak, 1984/2001
 Volume XXII: Cantatas and Choral Works with Orchestra
 XXII/1, Nos. 1-5: Name-day cantatas (1845–1855), edited by Franz Burkhart, Rudolf H. Führer and Leopold Nowak, 1987
 XXII/2, No. 6: Fest-Kantate Preiset den Herrn (1862), edited by Franz Burkhart, Rudolf H. Führer and Leopold Nowak, 1987
 XXII/2, No. 7: Germanenzug (1864), edited by Franz Burkhart, Rudolf H. Führer and Leopold Nowak, 1987
 XXII/2, No. 8: Helgoland (1893), edited by Franz Burkhart, Rudolf H. Führer and Leopold Nowak, 1987
 Volume XXIII: Songs and Secular Choral Works
 XXIII/1: Songs for voice and piano (1851–1882), edited by Angela Pachovsky, 1997
 XXIII/2: Secular choruses (1843–1893), edited by Angela Pachovsky and Anton Reinthaler, 2001
 Volume XXIV: Letters
 XXIV/1: Letters (1852–1886), edited by Andrea Harrandt and Otto Schneider, 1998/2009
 XXIV/2: Letters (1887–1896), edited by Andrea Harrandt and Otto Schneider, 2003
 Volume XXV: The Kitzler Study Book (1861–1863), facsimile edited by Paul Hawkshaw and Erich Wolfgang Partsch, 2014

New ongoing edition 
 Volume I/1: Symphony No. 1 in C minor, „Linz“ Version 1868, edited by Thomas Röder, 2016
 Volume IV/1: Symphony No. 4 in E-flat major, First Version (1874 version, revised 1875-76), edited by Benjamin M. Korstvedt, 2019
 Volume IV/2: Symphony No. 4 in E-flat major, Second Version (1881 version), edited by Benjamin M. Korstvedt, 2019

References 

Anton Bruckner

Bruckner